Johannes van der Horst (10 August 1909 – 14 September 1992) was a Dutch modern pentathlete. He competed at the 1936 Summer Olympics.

References

1909 births
1992 deaths
Dutch male modern pentathletes
Olympic modern pentathletes of the Netherlands
Modern pentathletes at the 1936 Summer Olympics
Sportspeople from The Hague
20th-century Dutch people